William Audley Rawson was a Republican member of both houses of the Michigan Legislature, representing portions of the Thumb from 1935 through 1946.

Born near Marlette, Rawson was elected township supervisor of Elkland Township in 1930. He was elected to the Michigan House of Representatives for Tuscola County in 1934, where he served four terms. Rawson was then elected to the Michigan Senate where he served two terms.

After retiring from political office, Rawson was a lobbyist for the Michigan Association of Insurance Companies. He was an alternate delegate to the 1944 Republican National Convention, a member of the Michigan Republican State Committee, and chairman of the Tuscola County Republican Party.

In 1958, Rawson and his first wife Mary established the Rawson Foundation which continues to provide scholarships for graduates of Cass City High School. The trust fund also helped establish the Rawson Memorial Library in Cass City in 1970. Rawson was named Cass City Citizen of the Year in 1971.

Rawson died of a heart attack in Pinellas Park, Florida on September 27, 1981, aged 88.

References

1893 births
1981 deaths
Republican Party Michigan state senators
Republican Party members of the Michigan House of Representatives
Michigan State University alumni
People from Sanilac County, Michigan
20th-century American politicians